Dimitar Vladev Ivanov (born 7 October 1970) is a former Bulgarian footballer and currently manager.

Career
Ivanov spent the majority of his career in Bulgaria, most notably having two spells with Bulgarian powerhouse CSKA Sofia. He is perhaps best known for scoring the fastest ever goal in The Eternal Derby, netting after 36 seconds in the 30 October 1999 match, helping the "redmen" to a 1:0 win. In the late 1990s, Ivanov played for Jeju United then known as Bucheon SK in South Korean K League. A serious car accident essentially forced him to retire at the age of 30, though he did make a number of appearances for Botev Plovdiv and his hometown club Elhovo (in the latter case as a player-manager between 2004 and 2006).

Coaching career
In August 2017, Ivanov was appointed as manager of Tundzha Yagoda.

References

External links
 

1970 births
Living people
People from Elhovo
Bulgarian footballers
Bulgarian football managers
Association football forwards
PFC CSKA Sofia players
Botev Plovdiv players
First Professional Football League (Bulgaria) players
K League 1 players
Jeju United FC players
Bulgarian expatriate footballers
Bulgarian expatriate sportspeople in South Korea
Expatriate footballers in South Korea
Bulgaria international footballers